Jameson Inn is an American hotel chain.

The chain operates under the name Jameson Inn in the Southeastern United States, and formerly under the name Signature Inn in the Midwestern United States.

Signature Inn began in 1981 in Indianapolis, Indiana, while Jameson Inn was founded in 1987 in Winder, Georgia.

The company was purchased by JER Partners in 2006, at which point the chain comprised 107 properties. Later that same year, it became part of Longhouse Hospitality, which also owns the Crestwood Suites, Sun Suites, and Lodge America brands. America's Best Franchising purchased the chain in 2012.

In 2014, Jameson Inns - along with several other ABF brands - was acquired by Vantage Hospitality.

References

External links
Official website

Hotels established in 1981
Hotel chains in the United States
Companies based in Atlanta
Red Lion Hotels Corporation
1981 establishments in Indiana